If Not Now, When? may refer to:

a saying by Hillel the Elder
If Not Now, When? (novel), a 1986 novel by Italian author Primo Levi
If Not Now, When? (album), a 2011 album by Incubus, or the title track
If Not Now, When?, a 2019 song by Allday from his album Starry Night Over the Phone
If not me, who? If not now, when? as spoken by activist Emma Watson during her 2014 HeforShe campaign kick-off

See also
 IfNotNow (organization)
 That Was Then This Is Now (disambiguation)
If Not Now Then When?, an album by Ethan Johns
If Not Now Then When, an album by The Motels
"If Not Now, Then When?", a single by King Gizzard & the Lizard Wizard